The Young Rascals is the debut album by rock band the Young Rascals. The album was released on March 28, 1966, and rose to No. 15 on the Billboard Top LPs chart and No. 10 in Cashbox.

Most of the songs on The Young Rascals were covers of songs written or originally performed by other artists, with only "Do You Feel It" authored by the band. However, "Good Lovin'", "Mustang Sally" and "In the Midnight Hour" would all become signature songs for the Rascals, with "Good Lovin'" b/w "Mustang Sally" becoming their first No. 1 single. The album also contained their charting debut single from late 1965, "I Ain't Gonna Eat Out My Heart Anymore".

Reception

In his review for AllMusic, music critic Bruce Eder, who highly praised the album and called it a "rare example of a genuinely great album that got heard and played, and sold and sold." The album was certified Gold by The Recording Industry Association of America.

Track listing

Side One
 "Slow Down" (Larry Williams) – 3:10
 "Baby Let's Wait" (Pam Sawyer, Lori Burton) – 3:19
 "Just a Little" (Ron Elliott, Bob Durand) – 2:59
 "I Believe" (Ervin Drake, Irvin Graham, Jimmy Shirl, Al Stillman) – 3:55
 "Do You Feel It" (Felix Cavaliere, Gene Cornish) – 3:18

Side Two
 "Good Lovin'" (Artie Resnick, Rudy Clark) – 2:28
 "Like a Rolling Stone" (Bob Dylan) – 6:09
 "Mustang Sally" (Mack Rice) – 3:59
 "I Ain't Gonna Eat Out My Heart Anymore" (Pam Sawyer, Lori Burton) – 2:41
 "In the Midnight Hour" (Steve Cropper, Wilson Pickett) – 4:00

Personnel

The Rascals
 Eddie Brigati – percussion, vocals (tracks 2, 4, 9)
 Felix Cavaliere – organ, vocals (tracks 1, 5, 6, 8, 10)
 Gene Cornish – guitar, vocals (tracks 3, 7)
 Dino Danelli – drums

Singles
"I Ain't Gonna Eat My Heart Out Anymore" / "Slow Down" (November 22, 1965) US: #52
"Good Lovin'" / "Mustang Sally" (3:20 edit) (February 21, 1966) US: #1

Certifications
US-Gold (500,000 copies sold).

References

1966 debut albums
Atlantic Records albums
The Rascals albums